Adam Lipčák (born 19 March 1997) is a Slovak footballer who plays as defender for Slovak club TJ Štart Hrabušice.

Career

FO ŽP Šport Podbrezová
Lipčák made his professional debut for FO ŽP Šport Podbrezová against FC Spartak Trnava on 13 May 2016.

References

External links
 FO ŽP Šport Podbrezová official club profile
   
 Futbalnet Profile

1997 births
Living people
Slovak footballers
Association football defenders
FK Železiarne Podbrezová players
Slovak Super Liga players
2. Liga (Slovakia) players
Sportspeople from Spišská Nová Ves